Eriocrania alpinella is a moth of the family Eriocraniidae, found in Central Europe, including Austria and Switzerland and possibly neighbouring countries.

The wingspan is 10.5-11.5 mm and the moth flies in June and July.

The larvae mine the leaves of green alder (Alnus viridis).

References

External links
 lepiforum.de
 Article in Zeitschrift der Wiener Entomologischen Gesellschaft
 Article on soceurlep.org

alpinella
Leaf miners
Moths described in 1958
Moths of Europe